Lyudmyla Kichenok and Nadiia Kichenok were the defending champions, but lost in the semifinals to fourth seeds Vitalia Diatchenko and Margarita Gasparyan.

Diatchenko and Gasparyan went on to win the tournament, defeating Michaela Boev and Anna-Lena Friedsam in the final, 6–4, 6–1.

Seeds

Draw

References 
 Draw

President's Cup - Women's Doubles
2014 WD